Six ships of the French Navy have borne the name Marengo in honour of the Battle of Marengo:
 Marengo (ex-Sceptre), a 74-gun ship of the line
 Marengo (1802) (ex-Jean-Jacques Rousseau), a  74-gun ship of the line
 Marengo, a 120-gun ship of the line started in 1807 as Marengo, and launched in 1851 as Ville de Paris
 , a 74-gun ship of the line
 , a small craft
  (1872), an  armoured frigate

Sources and references

French Navy ship names